Piškorevci is a village in eastern Croatia located south of Đakovo. The population is 1,907 (census 2011).

References

Populated places in Osijek-Baranja County